Pantelija "Panta" Draškić (Serbian Cyrillic: Пантелија Панта Драшкић; 30 November 1881 – 22 August 1957) was a Serbian army general and politician whose career spanned four decades.

Biography
Draškić was born in Užice in 1881, and served in the Balkan Wars and World War I. By the 1930s he was Adjutant to King Alexander I of Yugoslavia.

During World War II he sided with Milan Nedić's Government of National Salvation, which collaborated with Nazi Germany. He encouraged anti-partisan activities and recruited soldiers to fight the communists. In August 1941 he was appointed Minister of Labor for the regime, a post he soon left.

In 1943, Draškić joined the Chetniks, and returned to his rank of brigadier general.

During the occupation, he was the only member of Nedić's regime that is known to have aided in the rescue of Jews. He saved a Jewish Colonel, Abraham Beraha, and his wife from persecution by obtaining papers making them exempt from the laws and keeping them safe.

After the collapse of the government and the communist takeover, many Chetniks and former members of the Nedić regime fled with the Germans to Austria, though Draškić did not. He remained in Yugoslavia, and received a prison sentence from the communist authorities. He was the only member of the regime who remained in the country that did not get executed.

References

External links
RTS documentary about Panta Draškić

Serbian politicians
Serbian collaborators with Nazi Germany
Serbian people of World War II
1881 births
1957 deaths